Finnia Wunram (born 18 December 1995) is a German swimmer, specialising in open water events. She competed in the women's 10 km and 25 km events at the 2019 World Aquatics Championships, winning a silver medal in the latter. She qualified to represent Germany at the 2020 Summer Olympics.

References

External links
 

1995 births
Living people
German female swimmers
German female freestyle swimmers
People from Eckernförde
World Aquatics Championships medalists in open water swimming
German female long-distance swimmers
Sportspeople from Schleswig-Holstein